David S. Saxon (February 8, 1920 – December 8, 2005) was an American physicist and educator who served as the President of University of California system as well as the Chairman of the Board of Trustees of the Massachusetts Institute of Technology Corporation.

Saxon was born in St. Paul, Minnesota. He attended MIT where he earned a B.S. degree in 1941 and Ph.D. in 1944, both in Physics. He worked in MIT's famed wartime Radiation Laboratory during World War II.

Saxon joined UCLA in 1947, but was dismissed in 1950 with thirty other faculty members because of their objection to signing an oath of loyalty and declaration that they were not Communist Party members. The California Supreme Court later invalidated this requirement and Saxon returned to UCLA in 1952. While at UCLA, Saxon was a dean, vice chancellor, and executive vice chancellor. He served as the president of University of California between 1975 and 1983.

Saxon joined the MIT Corporation in 1977 and held the office of Chairman between 1983 and 1990.

Saxon was a Fellow of the American Academy of Arts and Sciences and a member of the American Philosophical Society, American Physical Society, and the American Association for the Advancement of Science. The Woods-Saxon potential in nuclear physics is named partly after him.

Saxon was married to his wife, Shirley, for 65 years and had six daughters and six grandchildren.

Books

Notes

References

External links
 
 David Saxon Lectures at UCLA
 
 
Photographs of David Saxon from the UC Santa Cruz Library's Digital Collections

1920 births
2005 deaths
Massachusetts Institute of Technology faculty
MIT Department of Physics alumni
University of California regents
Presidents of the University of California System
People from Saint Paul, Minnesota
University of California, Los Angeles faculty
People from Cheltenham, Pennsylvania
Members of the American Philosophical Society
20th-century American academics